Justin the Confessor (died 269 in Rome) was a Christian martyr in the Roman Empire. He is honoured as a saint by the Roman Catholic Church.

Life 
Justin the Confessor lived in the city of Rome at the time of the persecution of Christians in the Roman Empire. It is believed that Justin was martyred, either under Emperor Claudius II or under Emperor Valerian, the latter being more likely.

Justin was ordained as a priest by Pope Sixtus II. As a presbyter he led the Christian community of Rome, coming to know personally many important early Christians who were later canonized, and over whose burials he presided as a priest. Among these were: Lawrence of Rome, Hippolytus of Rome, Cyrilla of Rome, Romanus of Rome and even Pope Sixtus II. Justin conducted the funerals of murdered Christians with the participation of the Church of Rome, for example, on the Via Salaria or Via Tiburtina.

When Emperor Valerian heard that Justin worked fearlessly as a leader of the Christians in the community, encouraging them to stand up for their Christian faith in spite of the state's tyranny, the emperor had him arrested at a funeral and brought to him. Justin was interrogated but would not forswear his Christian faith. Emperor Valerian then ordered Justin to be beheaded. After his execution, Justin was buried on the Via Tributina by his community in a coemeterium of St. Cyriaca.

The first relics of Saint Justin were first taken from Rome by Bishop Hitto of Freising, with the consent of Pope Gregory IV, and brought to be venerated into what is, today, the Archdiocese of Munich and Freising, where they are kept in Freising Cathedral. Other relics of St. Justin are to be found in Mainz.

The feast day of Saint Justin is celebrated in the Catholic Church on 4 or 7 August.

Literature

External links 
 Biography (German)

3rd-century Christian saints
2nd-century births
3rd-century births
269 deaths
Clergy from Rome
3rd-century Christian clergy
3rd-century Christian martyrs